The Norwegian Skating Association (NSF) is the main skating authoritative body in Norway. It oversees speed skating, figure skating, short track speed skating on ice, and more recently inline and roller skating.

The Norwegian Skating Association was founded on 27 February 1893 and currently has about 7,000 members. It is a member of the Norwegian Olympic Committee and Confederation of Sports, the International Skating Union (ISU), and Federation International de Roller Skating (FIRS).

The NSA publishes a magazine named Skøytesport.

Past presidents
This is a list of former presidents of the Norwegian Skating Association:
1893–1894 : Hans Ditlev Alexander Fabricius
1894–1895 : Arthur Motzfeldt
1895–1896 : Peder Bredo Brodersen
1896–1897 : Hans Ditlev Alexander Fabricius
1897–1898 : Arthur Motzfeldt
1898–1900 : Henrik Olsen Biørn Homan
1900–1901 : Arthur Motzfeldt
1901–1902 : Olaf Norseng
1902–1903 : Arthur Motzfeldt
1903–1903 : Karl Ingvar Nandrup
1903–1904 : Arthur Motzfeldt
1904–1906 : Ivar Hellesnes
1906–1907 : Christopher Fougner
1907–1908 : Arthur Motzfeldt
1908–1911 : Aksel Gresvig
1911–1915 : Ludvig Albert Thue
1915–1916 : Aksel Gresvig
1916–1918 : Andreas Claussen
1918–1919 : Knut Ørn Meinich
1919–1922 : Andreas Claussen
1922–1925 : Knut Ørn Meinich
1925–1926 : Ivar Hellesnes
1926–1927 : Yngvar Bryn
1927–1929 : Anders Melteig
1929–1931 : Kristian Strøm
1931–1931 : Oskar Viktor Olsen
1931–1932 : Anders Melteig
1932–1937 : Gerhard Karlsen
1937–1938 : Magnus Johansen
1938–1940 : Henning August Olsen
1940–1940 : Ole Nils Tveter
1940–1945 : German occupation of Norway
1945–1946 : Ole Nils Tveter
1946–1949 : Reidar Gudmundsen
1949–1952 : Oskar Viktor Olsen
1952–1954 : Harald Halvorsen
1954–1956 : Nils W. Simensen
1956–1961 : Armand Carlsen
1961–1965 : Georg Krog
1965–1966 : Roald Vatn
1966–1969 : Willy Reisvang
1969–1973 : Olaf Poulsen
1973–1975 : Kjell Trystad
1975–1977 : Hroar Elvenes
1977–1979 : Martin Holtung
1979–1981 : Børre Rognlien
1981–1985 : Tore Bernt Ramton
1985–1986 : Bjørn Ruud
1986–1990 : Rune Gerhardsen
1990–1997 : Odd Pedersen
1997–1999 : Terje Andersen
1999–2001 : Finn Arne Bakke
2001–2003 : Rune Gerhardsen
2003–2007 : Terje Andersen
2007–2008 : Stein Rohde-Hanssen
2008–2013 : Vibecke Sørensen
2013–2017 : Rune Gerhardsen
2017–present : Mona Adolfsen

References

External links
Official site

Speed skating in Norway
Skating
Skating
Norway
1893 establishments in Norway
Organisations based in Oslo
Norway
Figure skating in Norway
Sports organizations established in 1893